Michael E. Bortner (born February 11, 1949) is a retired American judge, who sat on the York County, Pennsylvania Court of Common Pleas for over 17 years. In 2020, Bortner announced his plans to retire, and retired on January 4, 2021.  He was a member of the Pennsylvania State Senate, serving from 1991 to 1994. He also served in the Pennsylvania House of Representatives.

References

External links

Democratic Party members of the Pennsylvania House of Representatives
Democratic Party Pennsylvania state senators
Living people
1949 births